Phtheochroa krulikowskiji is a species of moth of the family Tortricidae. It is found in Russia, Kazakhstan, Turkmenistan, Kyrgyzstan and Mongolia.

The wingspan is 17–20 mm. Adults have been recorded on wing from August to October.

The larvae feed on Nanophyton caspicum.

References

Moths described in 1944
Phtheochroa